The Blacksun Festival was an annual 3-day goth and industrial music international festival held in New Haven, Connecticut, spread out between several different venues.

History
The festival started in 2005. The festival billed itself as more than just a weekend long concert, but also as a social event designed to pull people together from different parts of the world who share an interest in goth and industrial music.  In addition to live performances, the festival included a gothic fashion show, variety shows, a trivia contest, dance afterparties featuring various international goth and industrial DJs, and various music and fashion vendors.

Since many larger goth and industrial festivals are held in Europe, the Blacksun Festival provided a closer opportunity for North American bands to get a chance to perform in a festival setting alongside better established European bands. The final Blacksun was in August 2007.

Band lineups by year 
2008 (March 14–16)
Assemblage 23 | The Azoic | Cesium 137) |  Ego Likeness | Iris | Seabound | Zombie Girl | ...
DJs: Ian Fford

2007 (August 10–12)

Anders Manga | Bella Morte | The Birthday Massacre | Black Tape for a Blue Girl | Decoded Feedback | Gothsicles | Gothminister | Interface | Imperative Reaction | Life Cried | Nicki Jaine | No Response | Scrap.edx | Stochastic Theory | Stromkern | Tearwave | Terrorfakt | Unto Ashes | Voltaire
DJs: Fuligin (Corrosion, New Haven, CT); Tom Gold (The Castle, Tampa FL); Jet (Cybertron, New York, NY); Bruno Kramm (Das Ich, Germany); Phil Phaid (Flux, New Haven, CT)
Special guest promotions by Contempt! (New York, NY), Haven / DJ Addambombb (MA) and Das Bunker (Los Angeles, CA)
Additional events: Art Show & Reception, the Future Music Panel (with Martin Atkins, Bruno Kramm, Valerie Lovely, Andrew Sega, and Patrick Rogers), Panels, Tech Styles Fashion Show, Vendor Market

2006 (July 28–30)
Android Lust | Bloodwire | The Brides | Caustic | Chemlab | Claire Voyant | Combichrist | CTRL | Das Ich | Filament 38 | Informatik | Interrogation | Jenn Vix | The Last Dance | Null Device | PTI | 51 Peg
And One was originally slated to perform, but had to pull out due to visa complications. Das Ich took their spot in the lineup.
DJs: AddamBombb (Northampton, MA); Annabel Evil (NYC); Atterlothe (Providence, RI); Death In Jim (New Haven, CT); DV8 (Cleveland, OH); Kangal (Washington, D.C.), Mange (Hartford, CT); Mighty Mike Saga (Philadelphia, PA); Morgana (Toronto, Canada); Mothra (Boston, MA); Mouse (Raleigh, NC); Nitez (New Haven, CT); Phil Phaid (New Haven, CT); Ratboy (New Haven, CT); Reverend Brian (New Haven, CT); Th'Elf (Toronto, Canada); Vladvamp (Bandung, Indonesia)

2005 (August 5–7)
Das Ich (replaced by: Cesium 137) |  Razed In Black |  Decoded Feedback |  Iris |  Bella Morte |  Dismantled |  Voltaire |  Ego Likeness |  Carfax Abbey |  Platform One |  Nightcrawler 1947
DJs: Addambombb, Annabel Evil, Bat, Draven, Ferret, Lee, Lost Boy, Kramm, Rev. Brian, voodoo (San Francisco)

See also

List of industrial music festivals
List of electronic music festivals
List of gothic festivals

References

External links 
 Blacksun Festival Webpage
 2005 Blacksun Festival Archived Webpage

Music festivals established in 2005
Goth festivals
Electronic music festivals in the United States
Industrial music festivals
Culture of New Haven, Connecticut